Regina Marie Oceguera Schmuhl (born 4 September 1977), known in the U.S. as Gina Eagleson, is an American-born Mexican former professional footballer who captained the Mexico national team at the 1999 FIFA Women's World Cup. She also played for American soccer team Bay Area CyberRays in the Women's United Soccer Association (WUSA).

Playing career

College 
At Cal Poly San Luis Obispo, Oceguera was selected as the Big West Conference Player of the Year in 1997.

Club
In 2000 Oceguera played for Women's Premier Soccer League (WPSL) team Sacramento Storm.

She was drafted by San Diego Spirit ahead of the inaugural 2001 season of the Women's United Soccer Association (WUSA). When Joy Fawcett returned to San Diego from maternity leave in mid-season, Oceguera was cut from the roster to accommodate her. She had totaled 18 minutes of action across two games.

The Bay Area CyberRays then picked up Oceguera, who was delighted to be signed by her local team. Her $1,000-per-month contract was small compared to the league average which was in excess of $40,000-a-year. An anterior cruciate ligament injury sidelined the CyberRays' Australian defender Dianne Alagich and gave Oceguera an opportunity to play. She contributed to the team's success in winning the first ever WUSA Founders Cup.

In 2002, Oceguera quit soccer to pursue a career in teaching.

International

A promising forward for Cal Poly Mustangs in college soccer, Oceguera was converted to a defender by Mexico's coach Leonardo Cuéllar. She was one of several Californian players with Mexican eligibility to be called up by Cuéllar. She played as a sweeper for Mexico at the 1999 FIFA Women's World Cup, captaining the team in their opening 7–1 defeat by Brazil.

See also

List of Mexican footballers

References

External links

 Profile at Women's United Soccer Association (CyberRays)
 Profile at Women's United Soccer Association (Spirit)

1977 births
Living people
Citizens of Mexico through descent
Mexican women's footballers
Mexico women's international footballers
1999 FIFA Women's World Cup players
Women's association football defenders
Women's association football forwards
Cal Poly Mustangs women's soccer players
Women's United Soccer Association players
San Jose CyberRays players
People from Mountain View, California
American women's soccer players
Soccer players from California
American sportspeople of Mexican descent
California Storm players
Women's Premier Soccer League players